Angels Of Venice is a harp, cello, flute and vocal group founded by harpist Carol Tatum in 1993. The group's core sound is harp, flute and cello but also combines Middle Eastern, medieval and neoclassical styles.

Members 
 Carol Tatum - harp, Irish bouzouki, hammered dulcimer, keyboards, production
 Cathy Biagini - cello
 Susan Craig Winsberg - flutes/recorder
 Cathy Biagini and Irina Chirkova - cello

Their self-titled album was released through Windham Hill Records/Sony BMG as well as numerous tracks on twenty Windham Hill compilations. Originally Angels of Venice was purely an instrumental group with cameo vocal performances.
Featured guest vocalists who have recorded with Angels Of Venice are world music vocalist Azam Ali (VAS, Niyaz), shock-rock/goth singer Charles Edward (featured vocalist on Ancient Delirium) from the industrial goth band Seraphim Shock and early music/opera tenor Daniel Plaster ("Polorum regina" on the album Sanctus).  Founder Carol Tatum co-wrote songs with rock vocalist Lenny Wolf of the band Kingdom Come for the albums "Hands Of Time," "Bad Image," "Rendered Waters" and "Live & Unplugged."

Discography

Music For Harp, Flute And Cello  (1994)
Track listing
 Pachelbel's Canon
 Little Angels
 Dragonfly
 Crystal Tears
 An English Garden
 Greensleeves
 Sara's Dream
 Night Spirits
 Luna Mystica
 A Time For Dreams
 The Enchanted Forest
 Lover's Requiem
 The Reflecting Pool
 Dreamcatcher

Awake Inside A Dream (1996)
Track listing
 Lionheart
 A Chantar Mer
 Nana
 The Sins Of Salome
  Scarborough Faire (featuring the Dramatics)
 Three Nightingales
 The World Beyond The Woods
 China Moon
 Light At The Edge Of The World
 Awake Inside A Dream

Angels of Venice  (1999)
Track listing
 Sad Lisa
 Lionheart
 After The Harvest
 A Chantar Mer
 Within You Without You
 Trotto
 Queen Of The Sun
 Si Je Perdais Mon Ami
 As Tears Go By
 China Moon
 Tears Of The World (Lacrimae Mundi)

Music for Harp  (2001)
Track listing
 Nothing Else Matters (Metallica Cover) (04:55)
 Persentio (Latin for "to Deeply Feel") (06:23)
 Voyage of the Sea Witch (05:06)
 Starshine Lullabye (03:22)
 Non Alegra (03:18)
 Forever After (07:16)
 I Dreamt That I Dwelt in Marble Halls (04:29)
 Parson's Farewell (04:47)
 Wildflowers (05:16)
 Adagio in F Major (03:42)

Sanctus  (2003)
Track listing
 Carol of the Bells
 God Rest Ye Merry Gentlemen
 Little Drummer Boy
 Polorum Regina - Llibre Vermell (The Red Book, 14th Century)
 What Child is This?
 We Three Kings
 O Holy Night
 Silent Night
 Edelweiss
 Good King Winceslas
 Dance of the Sugar Plum Fairy
 Carol of the Bells (Vocal Version)

Ancient Delirium (2009)
Track listing
 Nag (The Serpent King)
 Ancient Delirium
 Dreams and Nightmares
 Friends (by Led Zeppelin
 Am I Dreaming?
 Dance Until You Forget
 Primitive Kiss
 Ahava
 I Fall
 How Can I?
 Courtesan Suite

References

External links 
 Angels Of Venice official site

New-age music groups